John L. White (born October 9, 1935) was a former American football tight end who played three seasons in the American Football League with the Houston Oilers and Oakland Raiders. He played college football at Texas Southern University. He was also a member of the Edmonton Eskimos of the Canadian Football League.

Professional career
White played in eighteen games for the Houston Oilers from 1960 to 1961. He played in seven games for the Oakland Raiders during the 1962 season.

White played in two games as an offensive end for the Edmonton Eskimos in 1963. In his final playing season, the team went 2–14.

Personal life
John White married Otho Raye Haynes (1959). He had two children, Shawnna White and Shametria White.

After his retirement from football, White served as a community activist in Houston's African-American Third Ward, founding Project PULL (Professionals United Leadership League) in a warehouse on McGowen street with his teammate Ernie Ladd. The PULL program provided opportunities to kids up to seventeen years of age, including sports, crafts, field trips, snacks, rap sessions and tutoring.

References

External links
Just Sports Stats

Living people
1935 births
Players of American football from Tampa, Florida
Players of Canadian football from Tampa, Florida
American football tight ends
Canadian football ends
American players of Canadian football
Texas Southern Tigers football players
Houston Oilers players
Oakland Raiders players
Edmonton Elks players
American Football League players